Association of Writers of the Faroe Islands (in Faroese called Rithøvundafelag Føroya) is an association for authors and translators who write in the Faroese language. These authors live primarily in the Faroe Islands, but some of them also live in other countries. Some Faroese writers write not only in Faroese but also in Danish, but most Faroese writers write primarily in Faroese. The Faroese language is only spoken by the Faroese people of the Faroe Islands, which currently have a population of 50.000 people. The Association of Writers of the Faroe Islands was established in 1957.

Presidents 
Vónbjørt Vang 2015—
Ludvík á Brekku 2015
Sámal Soll 2014—2015
Helle Thede Johansen 2012—2014
Malan Poulsen 2011–2012
Rakel Helmsdal 2009–2011
Arnbjørn Ó. Dalsgarð 2007–2009
Heðin M. Klein 2006–2007
Carl Jóhan Jensen 2004–2006
Gunnar Hoydal 1998–2004
Lydia Didriksen 1997–1998
Heðin M. Klein 1994–1997
Hanus Kamban 1992–1994
Carl Jóhan Jensen 1991–1992
Turið Sigurðardóttir 1989–1991
Martin Næs 1986–1989
Gunnar Hoydal 1981–1986
Marianna Debes Dahl 1980–1981
Karsten Hoydal 1976–1980
Jákup í Jákupsstovu 1973–1976
Jens Pauli Heinesen 1970–1973
Ólavur Michelsen 1968–1970
Valdemar Poulsen 1967–1968
Martin Joensen 1957–1959

References

External links 
 Association of Writers of the Faroe Islands (Rithøvundafelag Føroya)

Faroese literature
Organizations based in the Faroe Islands
Writers' organizations by country
Organizations established in 1957